Tura-Dagan (Tu-ra-Dda-gan, c. 2075–2050 BCE) was a ruler of the city of Mari, northern Mesopotamia, after the fall of the Akkadian Empire. He was son of Apil-Kin, and brother of Ili-Ishar. He held the title of Shakkanakku (military governor), which was borne by all the princes of a dynasty who reigned at Mari in the late third millennium and early second millennium BC. These kings were the descendants of the military governors appointed by the kings of Akkad. He was contemporary of the Third Dynasty of Ur, and probably their vassal.

He had a son, who succeeded him, named Puzur-Ishtar.

Inscriptions 
The Museum of the Ancient Orient has a statue of Tura-Dagan, but it is headless and the inscription is heavily damaged. Tura-Dagan is also known from various seals and dynastic lists.

A statue of Puzur-Ishtar is known from the Royal Palace of Mari, now in the Museum of the Ancient Orient in Istanbul, with an inscription on the hem of the statue’s skirt mentioning his father Tura-Dagan.

The inscription on the hem of the statue reads:

References 

21st-century BC rulers
Kings of Mari
21st-century BC people